Scopula crawshayi is a moth of the family Geometridae. It was named by Prout in 1932. It is endemic to Kenya.

References

Endemic fauna of Kenya
Moths described in 1932
crawshayi
Taxa named by Louis Beethoven Prout
Moths of Africa